James Hahn (born 1950) was the 40th mayor of Los Angeles, California. James Hahn or Jim Hahn may also refer to:

James F. Hahn (born 1935), American politician from Iowa
James Hahn (golfer) (born 1981), American professional golfer
James Hahn, United States Navy officer for whom Hahn Island, Antarctica, was named